Deutsch Jahrndorf is a municipality in the district of Neusiedl am See, in the Austrian state of Burgenland. It is within a few kilometres of the borders of both Hungary and Slovakia. Deutsch Jahrndorf is the easternmost municipality of Austria, at 17th meridian east, and the easternmost commune of the German Sprachraum since 1945 and the expulsions of the Germans.

History
With Burgenland, the former Hungarian village passed to the Republic of Austria after World War I.
During the Cold War, or from shortly after World War II until the Revolutions of 1989, Deutsch Jahrndorf was the easternmost community in Central Europe with a Western market economy. It lies farther to the east than all of the former East Germany and is farther east than parts of Poland and parts of what were then Czechoslovakia and Yugoslavia, all of which were communist countries behind the "Iron Curtain".

Population

Politics
Seats in the municipal assembly (Gemeinderat) as of 2007 elections:
 Social Democratic Party of Austria (SPÖ): 6
 Austrian People's Party (ÖVP): 5
 Freedom Party of Austria (FPÖ): 2

International relations

Twin towns — Sister cities
Deutsch Jahrndorf is twinned with:
  Hamuliakovo, Slovakia
  Rajka, Hungary

See also
Jarovce

References

Cities and towns in Neusiedl am See District
Slovak communities in Burgenland